Berke Dam is concrete arch-gravity dam built on the Ceyhan river in southern Turkey. There is a hydroelectric power plant, established in 2001 at the dam, with a power output of 510 MW (three facilities at 170 MW each). "Technical Data" Tunnels             = Water Intake Tunnel: 7200 meter; Highway Access Tunnel: 4300 meter & Grouting galleries; HRT: 6200 meter

References

External links

Hydroelectric power stations in Turkey
Dams completed in 1999
Dams on the Ceyhan River
1999 establishments in Turkey